Agnes Akiror Egunyu (born 28 July 1968), known as Agnes Akiror, is a Ugandan politician. She is the current State Minister for Teso Affairs in the Cabinet of Uganda. She was appointed to that position on 6 June 2016. Prior to that, from 27 May 2011 until 6 June 2016, she served as Minister of State for Tourism. She replaced Serapio Rukundo, who was dropped from the cabinet. In the cabinet reshuffle of 1 March 2015, she retained her cabinet post. On account of being a cabinet minister, she is an ex-officio Member of Parliament.

Background and education
Akiror was born in Kumi District on 28 July 1968. After attending a local primary school, she enrolled in Ngora High School in Ngora, graduating in 1984. For her A-Level education, she attended Mende Kalema Memorial Senior Secondary School, in Wakiso District, graduating from there in 1988. She attended the International Institute of Business and Media Studies, graduating in 2000, with the Diploma in Accounting. She attended Uganda Martyrs University from 2006 until 2010, graduating with the degree of Bachelor of Arts in Democracy & Development Studies. She also holds the Certificate in Sustainable Human Development, obtained from Negev College in Israel in 2008.

Career
From 1988 until 1989, she served as an accounting assistant at Oya Rural Development Association. From 2000 until 2005, she served as the Managing Director of Eyalama, a local non-governmental organization. She served as the Member of Parliament representing the women of Kumi District on the Forum for Democratic Change political party ticket. However, in 2010, she left the FDC and lost her parliamentary seat. On 6 June 2016, she was named State Minister for Teso Affairs.

Other considerations
Agnes Akiror is single. She is of the Roman Catholic faith.

See also
Cabinet of Uganda
Parliament of Uganda
Government of Uganda
Kumi
List of members of the tenth Parliament of Uganda

References

External links
Full Ministerial Cabinet List, May 2011
Website of the Parliament of Uganda

Living people
1968 births
Government ministers of Uganda
Members of the Parliament of Uganda
National Resistance Movement politicians
Uganda Martyrs University alumni
People from Kumi District
People from Eastern Region, Uganda
21st-century Ugandan women politicians
21st-century Ugandan politicians
Women government ministers of Uganda
Women members of the Parliament of Uganda